Yesterday You Said Tomorrow is a studio album by American jazz trumpeter Christian Scott. Concord Music Group released the album on February 1, 2010 in the UK and on March 30, 2010 in the US.

Background
As Scott says in the album's liner notes, this album "was designed in subject matter and sound to have the brevity and character of the recordings of the '60s," inspired by the likes of Miles Davis, John Coltrane, Jimi Hendrix and Bob Dylan. Yesterday You Said Tomorrow is a successful manifestation of the music concept that he calls "stretch music". The concept understands and respects the jazz traditions that came before and doesn't attempt to replace them, instead trying to embrace within its rhythmic and harmonic frameworks as many musical forms and cultural languages as possible. His later albums Christian aTunde Adjuah and Stretch Music will be thoughtful extensions of that model.

Reception
Graham Reid of Elsewhere stated "Recorded, mixed and mastered by Blue Note legend Rudy Van Gelder, this album has the sonic presence of some of the classic Sixties albums and Scott is on record saying he was inspired by albums like Dylan's Blonde on Blonde as much as politically engaged material by Coltrane and others. Scott is one of the most interesting and innovative musicians of his post-Wynton generation and this excellent album should secure his place as a leader in jazz which is not only different, interesting and emotionally engaging but music with depth which invites political and social discussion. That makes him a very rare musician – jazz or otherwise – indeed."

Chris May of All About Jazz wrote "Trumpeter Christian Scott started raising expectations in 2006, with Rewind That (Concord), and hit the spot again in 2007 and 2008. Those earlier promises of greatness are clinched by Yesterday You Said Tomorrow. Scott's fourth Concord album is a gym-ripped amalgam of edgy jazz, hip hop and rock rhythms, off-kilter ostinatos, intimate rhapsodies and full-on passions, all welded together by the New Orleans-born player's alternately caressing and searing horn, and by his most tightly focused band to date."

Track listing
All tracks are written by Christian Scott unless otherwise indicated.

 K.K.P.D. (7:08)
 The Eraser (5:30), written by Thom Yorke
 After All (7:55), written by Matthew Stevens
 Isadora (6:16)
 Angola, LA & The 13th Amendment (8:40)
 The Last Broken Heart (Prop 8) (5:49)
 Jenacide (The Inevitable Rise and Fall of the Bloodless Revolution) (6:51)
 The American't (7:09)
 An Unending Repentance (9:42)
 The Roe Effect (Refrain in F# Minor) (3:17), written with Matthew Stevens

Personnel
 Christian Scott – trumpet
 Matthew Stevens – guitar
 Milton Fletcher, Jr. – piano
 Kristopher Keith Funn – bass
 Jamire Williams – drums

Chart performance

References

2010 albums
Christian Scott albums
Concord Records albums
Albums produced by Chris Dunn